Timothy David Wilkinson (born 26 July 1978) is a professional golfer from New Zealand.

Biography
Wilkinson was born in Palmerston North, and was educated at St Peter's College. He won the New Zealand Stroke Play Championship in 2000 and turned professional in 2003.

Wilkinson joined the second tier Nationwide Tour in 2005, but failed to win enough money to graduate directly to the PGA Tour. He finally obtained his PGA Tour card by finishing inside the top 25 at the 2007 qualifying school.

Wilkinson had a successful rookie season on the PGA Tour in 2008, the highlights being an outright third at the Zurich Classic of New Orleans and finishing joint runner-up at the Valero Texas Open, two shots behind winner Zach Johnson. He made over one million dollars in prize money and finished 92nd on the final money list.

In 2009, Wilkinson played in the final pairing at the Verizon Heritage, but faded to finish T6. A thumb ligament injury curtailed his season and saw him gain a major medical extension of his playing rights. By June 2010 he had played the 12 events this extension afforded him, and had not earned enough money to retain his status.

Wilkinson finished fifth on the 2013 Web.com Tour regular season money list to earn his 2014 PGA Tour card.

Amateur wins
2000 New Zealand Stroke Play Championship
2002 SBS Invitational

Playoff record
Korn Ferry Tour playoff record (0–1)

Results in major championships

CUT = missed the half-way cut
"T" indicates a tie for a place

Team appearances
Amateur
Nomura Cup (representing New Zealand): 2001
Eisenhower Trophy (representing New Zealand): 2002
Bonallack Trophy (representing Asia/Pacific): 2002 (winners)

Professional
World Cup (representing New Zealand): 2013

See also
2007 PGA Tour Qualifying School graduates
2013 Web.com Tour Finals graduates
2015 Web.com Tour Finals graduates
2016 Web.com Tour Finals graduates
2019 Korn Ferry Tour Finals graduates

References

External links

New Zealand male golfers
PGA Tour of Australasia golfers
PGA Tour golfers
Korn Ferry Tour graduates
Left-handed golfers
People educated at St Peter's College, Palmerston North
Sportspeople from Palmerston North
People from Jacksonville Beach, Florida
1978 births
Living people